The effects of Hurricane Irene in Connecticut were not as severe as farther south in New York and New Jersey, where the storm actually made landfall. Nonetheless, Connecticut still saw tropical storm force winds as a result of the hurricane which were attributed to 10 deaths.

Background

Since the 1600s, Connecticut has been affected by 73 tropical cyclones, few of which have made landfall in the state. Of these storms, the 1938 New England hurricane is regarded as the single-most destructive natural disaster in Connecticut history, causing considerable loss of life and widespread damage. Prior to Irene, the most recent hurricane to strike the state was Hurricane Gloria in 1985 which moved through the region as a Category 1. However, several tropical storms since then have impacted Connecticut, such as Tropical Storm Hanna in 2008.

On August 21, 2011, a tropical wave near the Lesser Antilles became sufficiently organized to be classified as Tropical Storm Irene, the ninth named storm of the 2011 season. Tracking generally towards the west-northwest, the system struck Puerto Rico early on August 22 and intensified into a hurricane shortly thereafter. As Irene moved through the Bahamas, a distinct eye, surrounded by deep convection, appeared on satellite imagery. Hurricane Hunters flying in the storm determined that the cyclone attained major hurricane status – Category 3 or higher on the Saffir–Simpson Hurricane Scale – by August 24. The following day, a long-awaited northward turn took place as Irene approached Abaco Island. As the storm tracked towards United States, structural changes accompanied by wind shear, an environmental factor that weakens hurricanes, caused the system to gradually weaken.

On the morning of August 27, Irene made landfall as a Category 1 hurricane near Cape Lookout, North Carolina. Structural degradation over the following day resulting in slow weakening of the storm as it approached New England. After weakening to a tropical storm early on August 28, Irene made another landfall, this time in New Jersey, before moving back over water. Several hours later, the system moved onshore a final time near New York City. Tracking northward over New York and later New England, Irene gradually lost its tropical characteristics and early on August 29, the final advisory on the storm was issued by the National Hurricane Center; by this time, the cyclone was situated over northern New England.

Preparations

As early as August 24, residents in parts of Connecticut began bracing themselves for a potential strike from a hurricane. Meteorologists reportedly received calls from residents in a panic wanting to know the trajectory of Irene. Local mayors initiated debris removal operations across many highways and local roads. The first selectman of Bethel stated that sandbags were already being readied to protect certain areas from flooding. By August 25, Governor Dannel P. Malloy declared a state of emergency, allowing the state to order evacuations and protect the well-being of residents. In a press conference, Malloy urged residents "to take the storm 'as seriously as any event we've ever prepared for.'" In light of this, stores reported a significant increase in sales; items such as generators, batteries and flashlights sold in large numbers across the state. Due to the threat of widespread power outages, Connecticut Light & Power canceled vacations and placed all personnel on standby in advance of the storm.

Towns across Connecticut began enacting emergency plans, such as designating and preparing shelters, on August 25. Local boards of selectmen held several meetings on which areas required public shelters and what buildings to use for this purpose. In some areas, school districts decided to delay their first day until August 30 while others until September 1.Central Connecticut State University also canceled classes for August 29. Early on August 26, a hurricane watch was issued for the entire Connecticut coastline and tropical storm warnings were put in place for all inland counties. All campgrounds and state parks were planned to be shut down by August 28 due to dangerous conditions.

In Norwich, emergency officials prepared 10,000 sandbags and stated 4,000 more could be filled if needed. Voluntary evacuations orders were also issued of residents living in low-lying areas or mobile homes in Norwich. About 200 Connecticut National Guard soldiers were notified to be deployed in state on August 28 while 500 others were placed on standby. Mass transit, including all Metro-North trains, across the state was shut down for the duration of the storm, beginning on the evening of August 27. At the Naval Submarine Base New London in Groton, all submarines were moved out to sea to ride out the storm before being allowed to return. Mandatory evacuations of coastal areas in Fairfield were implemented on August 27 and roads across the city were to be mostly closed by the following afternoon. A local high school was also converted into a shelter for evacuees.

Impact

Although the center of Irene passed through southwestern Connecticut, the storm's asymmetric structure and weakened state limited the effects of winds across the state. However, the long duration of winds in excess of  led to widespread tree damage that left more than 750,000 people without power. Portions of Connecticut Route 15 closed due to the storm. In total, 10 people died in Connecticut due to the Hurricane.

Aftermath
Following Irene's passage on August 28, Governor Dannel P. Malloy and Lieutenant Governor Nancy Wyman began viewing damage from the storm in West Haven and East Haven. The governor also made a public briefing that evening to residents from the emergency operations center. Later on August 28, it was announced that all non-essential employees were to return to work the following day unless their workplace was without power. In light of severe damage across state parks, beaches and campgrounds, most facilities were kept closed through September 1 and some until September 2. Following a fuel assessment by Department of Consumer Protection Commissioner William M. Rubenstein, residents were advised that although there was a sufficient amount of gasoline available, lack of distribution centers would limit the amount that could be purchased. As a result, Rubenstein suggested limited driving until services were restored.

On August 31, a state-run donation center was set up for residents affected by the storm. On September 1, officials from the Federal Emergency Management Agency (FEMA) began touring the hardest hit areas of the state. The Department of Motor Vehicles announced that residents with licenses expiring between August 27 and September 12 would be allowed to delay license renewal until September 12 without late fees.

On September 2, Governor Malloy announced that $1 million in federal funds would be available for transportation infrastructure repairs. The Connecticut Department of Transportation also estimated that clean-up costs across the state would reach $5 million. Later that day, President Barack Obama signed a disaster declaration for Connecticut, allowing federal aid to be distributed throughout the state for recovery efforts. Following further FEMA assessments, it was deemed that all eight counties of Connecticut were eligible for disaster assistance on September 4. On September 7, nine FEMA disaster recovery centers opened up across the state to assist residents and businesses with losses.

Once the initial disaster response plan had been completed, the state Government created a panel on September 13, known as the State Team Organized for the Review of Management of Irene (S.T.O.R.M. Irene), to assess how the state prepared for, handled, and was recovering from the hurricane.

See also

Hurricane Irene (2011)
2011 Atlantic hurricane season

References

August 2011 events in the United States
Hurricane Irene
Effects of hurricanes in the United States
Hurricanes in Connecticut